The Rajasthan Assembly Building  is one of the most modern legislature complexes in India. It is situated in Jyoti Nagar, Jaipur the capital of the state.

History   

From 1952 to 2000, the Sawai Man Singh Town Hall was being used for Rajasthan Legislative Assembly. The 5th session of the 11th Legislative Assembly was the last session, which was held in Sawai Man Singh Town Hall on 6 November 2000.   Work on this Project commenced in November 1994 and completed in March 2001.

Description   

The exterior of the building has been provided with famous traditional features of Rajasthan such as Jharokas, Chhatries, Kamani, Baradaries, Arches, Todies etc. in Jodhpur and Bansi Paharpur stone. The interior entrance lounges have been decorated in the famous Rajasthani traditional art on walls and ceilings representing traditional art of four regions of Jaipur, Shekhawati, Marwar and Mewar.   

The building is an eight storeved frame structure having height of 145 feet and floor area of 6.08 lac sqft. The main dome has a diameter of 104 feet. The assembly hall has a seating capacity for 260 members and a hall of identical capacity over it at fifth floor for future Vidhan Parishad (Upper House).   

The building has been provided with many modern facilities.

References
 Rajassembly.nic.in

Legislative buildings in India
Tourist attractions in Jaipur
Buildings and structures in Jaipur
Rajasthan Legislative Assembly